The Thundermans is an American comedy television series created by Jed Spingarn that aired on Nickelodeon from October 14, 2013 to May 25, 2018. The series stars Kira Kosarin, Jack Griffo, Addison Riecke, Diego Velazquez, Chris Tallman, Rosa Blasi, and Maya Le Clark, and features the voice of Dana Snyder as Dr. Colosso.

Series overview

Episodes

Season 1 (2013–14)

Season 2 (2014–15)

Season 3 (2015–16)

Season 4 (2016–18) 
 On May 22, 2018, Nickelodeon aired a five-minute preview of the final four episodes titled "The Final Four Preview".

See also 
 List of The Thundermans characters

Notes

References 

Thundermans
Thundermans
Thundermans